The 1945 State of the Union Address was given to the 79th United States Congress on Saturday, January 6, 1945, by the 32nd President of the United States, Franklin D. Roosevelt.  It was given in the year he died.  It was given during the final year of World War II. He stated, "In considering the State of the Union, the war and the peace that is to follow are naturally uppermost in the minds of all of us. 
This war must be waged--it is being waged--with the greatest and most persistent intensity. Everything we are and have is at stake. Everything we are and have will be given. American men, fighting far from home, have already won victories which the world will never forget. 
We have no question of the ultimate victory. We have no question of the cost. Our losses will be heavy.
We and our allies will go on fighting together to ultimate total victory."

References

State of the Union addresses
Presidency of Franklin D. Roosevelt
Speeches by Franklin D. Roosevelt
79th United States Congress
State of the Union Address
State of the Union Address
State of the Union Address
State of the Union Address
World War II speeches
January 1945 events in the United States